This Isn't Me is an album by the band 411, released in 1991 (see 1991 in music).

Track listing
All songs by Murphy/O'Mahony unless otherwise noted.
"Face the Flag" – 2:53
"Blackout" – 2:33
"This Isn't Me" – 3:07
"Self Help" – 2:15
"Destroy the Dream" – 1:50
"The Naked Face" – 3:16
"Those Homophobic" – 2:10
"Our Father" – 3:06
"Show Me" (O'Mahony, Stanton) – 2:41
"Carnal Knowledge" (O'Mahony, Stanton) – 2:51

Personnel
Donnell Cameron - Engineer, Producer
411 - Main Performer
Kevin Murphy - Guitar, Vocals (Background)
Josh Stanton - Bass, Vocals (Background)
Gavin Oglesby - Vocals (Background)
Aaron Silverman - Vocals (Background)
Mike Murphy - Vocals (Background)
Dave Smalley - Vocals (Background)
Billy Rubin - Vocals (Background)
Mario Reza - Vocals (Background)
Mario Rubalcaba - Drums, Vocals (Background)
John Yates - Logo
Dan O'Mahony - Artwork, Vocals, Photography, Layout Design, Cover Photo, Vocals (Background)
Dave Mandel - Photography

References

External links

1991 albums